Bala Kailasam (26 October 1960 – 15 August 2014) was an Indian documentary filmmaker and playwright who worked mainly in the Tamil film industry. He was the son of Tamil filmmaker Kailasam Balachander.

Education
Bala Kailasam graduated in Electronics and Communication Engineering from the University of Madras in 1983 and trained in Film and Video Production at the University of Iowa in Iowa City.

Career
Bala Kailasam was the Creative and Business Head of Min Bimbangal Productions Private Limited, which has produced TV programs in Tamil, Telugu, Malayalam, Kannada and Hindi. He was also the Creative Head of Puthiya Thalaimurai TV, 24-hour news channel in Tamil from 2011 to 2013.

Filmography
 1987 - The Twice Discriminated
 1992 - Veli
 1990 - Marabu Vasstu 
 1992 - Quality, Our own Heritage
 2009 - WritingonWater
 2009 - NeerunduNilamundu

Television series
1993 - Raghuvamsam, Sun TV, Tamil
1994 - Marmadesam, Sun TV, Tamil
1995 -
 Ramany vs Ramany (Tamil Sitcom),  Sun TV, Tamil
Nayyandi Durbar
Veetukku Veedu Looty
Kathai Alla Nijam

Memorials
The Bala Kailasam Memorial Award for excellence in documentary film-making was established by Cinema Rendezvous Trust to honor Bala Kailasam.

References

1960 births
2014 deaths
Indian documentary filmmakers
Indian dramatists and playwrights